Autódromo Ricardo Mejía was a  motor racing circuit located in Bogotá, Colombia.

The circuit was inaugurated on 7 February 1971 with the Gran Premio República de Colombia, the first track competition held in the country. It hosted various national and international speed and endurance championships, as well as hosting a round of the 1972 American Formula 2 season. Upon its inauguration, the circuit was considered to host a Formula One grand prix, replacing the Mexican Grand Prix, but no deal was finalized. In 1978, after several disagreements between the sports entities of national motorsports and its owner Ricardo Mejía, the circuit was closed. In 1980 parts of the property were acquired for the construction of infrastructure for commercial services.

References 

Sports venues in Bogotá
1971 establishments in Colombia
1978 disestablishments in Colombia
Ricardo Mejia
Defunct motorsport venues